Cloughjordan railway station serves the town and surrounding area of Cloughjordan, County Tipperary in the Midwest of Ireland. The station is located 1 km south west of the town centre on the Templemore Road.

Cloughjordan railway station opened to the public on 5 October 1863 and is on the Limerick-Ballybrophy railway line, located between Nenagh railway station and Roscrea railway station. Passengers can connect at Ballybrophy to trains heading northeast to Dublin or southwest to Cork or Tralee.

The station is unstaffed and has a car park. A partnership between the local Tidy Towns group and Irish Rail has seen several improvements to the station and its surroundings.

Buildings

The station façade, signal cabin, platform, entrance piers and gates are listed as protected structures by Tipperary County Council (RPS Ref S457). The National Inventory of Architectural Heritage lists the station building and station masters house as being of architectural and social interest, with the five bay goods shed and road bridge which carries the R490 over the railway being listed as of architectural and technical interest. Until 1977, when the signal cabin closed, there was passing loop, where trains could cross at the station.

Services

As of 2021, services were as follows:

Mon - Sat

 2 trains to Limerick Colbert (2 trains Mon - Fri)
 2 trains to Ballybrophy

Sundays

 1 train to Limerick Colbert
 1 train to Ballybrophy

Proposed developments
In November 2016 it was announced the line was very likely to close in 2018 as the demand for the service was low and CIE/IE wished to close it to save money. This was subsequently ruled out by Irish Rail (Iarnród Éireann).

The North Tipperary Community Rail Partnership have long campaigned to improve the Limerick–Ballybrophy railway line service.

There is a phased continuous welded rail (CWR) track relay project being carried out on the line over the last few years. The majority of the remaining jointed track, yet to be relayed, is between Cloughjordan and Roscrea stations. On 1 November 2021 the line closed for 5 weeks to allow up to 3.5 miles of old jointed track to be relaid with modern CWR.

See also
 List of railway stations in Ireland

References

External links
 Irish Rail Cloughjordan Station Website
 Cloughjordan Station on Eire Trains
 Ballybrophy-Roscrea-Nenagh-Limerick line

Railway stations opened in 1863
Iarnród Éireann stations in County Tipperary
Cloughjordan